Unelcus bolivianus is a species of beetle in the family Cerambycidae. It was described by Stephan von Breuning in 1966. It is known from Bolivia.

References

Desmiphorini
Beetles described in 1966